Joop is a Dutch masculine given name. It may also refer to:

 JOOP!, a German fashion house
 Wolfgang Joop (born 1944), German fashion designer and founder of JOOP!
 Journal of Occupational and Organizational Psychology, an academic journal published on behalf of the British Psychological Society